Vila Velha State Park is a state park in the city of Ponta Grossa, Paraná State, Brazil. It is located at one hundred kilometers from Curitiba, capital of the State of Paraná. The set of formations resembles a medieval city with its castles and towers in ruins, hence its name. The average height of the stone columns and walls is twenty meters and can reach thirty meters or more at some points, depending on the uneven terrain.

See also
 Iguaçu National Park

References

External links
Mineropar - Parque Estadual Vila Velha

State parks of Brazil
World Heritage Sites in Brazil
Protected areas established in 1990
Protected areas of Paraná (state)
Ponta Grossa
1990 establishments in Brazil